This is a list of high voltage (above 150 kV) AC electrical  transmission lines. This list is incomplete.

For high-voltage direct current, both underground and submarine, see List of HVDC projects.

Austria

Czech Republic

Denmark

Denmark/ Sweden

Egypt/Jordan

Germany

Morocco/ Spain

Italy

Italy / Malta

Luxembourg

Netherlands

New Zealand

Norway

Spain

Switzerland/ Italy

Turkey

United Kingdom

UK – Europe

Canada

References

High voltage